Adrian Manuel Scarlatache (born 5 December 1986) is a Romanian professional footballer who plays as a defender for Liga I club CS Mioveni, which he captains. In his career, Scarlatache also played for teams such as Dinamo București, Khazar Lankaran, Keşla FK or Zira FK, among others.

Club career
He started his career for Dinamo București but was loaned out to different other clubs, amongst which Pandurii Târgu Jiu or Mioveni.

In 2011, he was loaned out to Khazar Lankaran, in Azerbaijan, where he impressed but was not kept. He returned to Dinamo, where he became integral part of the first team, and scored the winning goal in the Romanian Cup final against Rapid București. After the final, he announced that he was leaving Dinamo, going back to Lankaran, where he signed a contract for two years with Khazar.

On 2016, Scarlatache signed with Astra Giurgiu.

On 4 September 2018, Scarlatache signed one-year contract with Zira FK.
On 11 June 2019, Scarlatache signed a new one-year contract with Zira.

Career statistics

Honours

Club
Dinamo București
Liga I : 2006–07
Cupa României : 2011–12

Khazar Lankaran 
Azerbaijan Cup : 2010–11
Azerbaijan Supercup : 2013

Astra Giurgiu
Liga I : 2015–16

Keşla FK
Azerbaijan Cup : 2017–18

References

External links
 
 

1986 births
Living people
People from Turnu Măgurele
Romanian footballers
Footballers from Bucharest
Romanian expatriate footballers
Association football defenders
FC Dinamo București players
CS Pandurii Târgu Jiu players
CSM Jiul Petroșani players
CS Mioveni players
CS Otopeni players
Khazar Lankaran FK players
FC Astra Giurgiu players
Shamakhi FK players
Zira FK players
FC Hermannstadt players
Liga I players
Azerbaijan Premier League players
Romanian expatriate sportspeople in Azerbaijan
Expatriate footballers in Azerbaijan